The   national flag of France is a tricolour featuring three vertical bands coloured blue (hoist side), white, and red. It is known to English speakers as the Tricolour, although the flag of Ireland and others are also so known. The design was adopted after the French Revolution; while not the first tricolour, it became one of the most influential flags in history. The tricolour scheme was later adopted by many other nations in Europe and elsewhere, and, according to the Encyclopædia Britannica has historically stood "in symbolic opposition to the autocratic and clericalist royal standards of the past".

Before the tricolour was adopted the royal government used many flags, the best known being a blue shield and gold fleur-de-lis (the Royal Arms of France) on a white background, or state flag. Early in the French Revolution, the Paris militia, which played a prominent role in the storming of the Bastille, wore a cockade of blue and red, the city's traditional colours. According to French general Gilbert du Motier, Marquis de Lafayette, white was the "ancient French colour" and was added to the militia cockade to form a tricolour, or national, cockade of France.

This cockade became part of the uniform of the National Guard, which succeeded the militia and was commanded by Lafayette. The colours and design of the cockade are the basis of the Tricolour flag, adopted in 1790, originally with the red nearest to the flagpole and the blue farthest from it. A modified design by Jacques-Louis David was adopted in 1794. The royal white flag was used during the Bourbon Restoration from 1815 to 1830; the tricolour was brought back after the July Revolution and has been used since then, except for an interruption for a few days in 1848. Since 1976, there have been two versions of the flag in varying levels of use by the state: the original (identifiable by its use of navy blue) and one with a lighter shade of blue. Since 2020, France has used the older variant by default, including at the Élysée Palace.

Design
Article 2 of the French constitution of 1958 states that "the national emblem is the tricolour flag, blue, white, red". No law has specified the shades of these official colours. In English blazon, the flag is described as tierced in pale azure, argent and gules.

The blue stripe has usually been a dark navy blue; a lighter blue (and slightly lighter red) version was introduced in 1974 by President Valéry Giscard d'Estaing. Both versions were used from then; town halls, public buildings and barracks usually fly the darker version of the flag, but the lighter version was sometimes used even on official State buildings.

On 13 July 2020, President Emmanuel Macron reverted, without any statement and with no orders for other institutions to use a specific version, to the darker hue for the presidential Élysée Palace, as a symbol of the French Revolution. The move was met with comments both in favour of and against the change, but it was noted that both the darker and lighter flags have been in use for decades.

Currently, the flag is one and a half times wider than its height (i.e. in the proportion 2:3) and, except in the French Navy, has stripes of equal width. Initially, the three stripes of the flag were not equally wide, being in the proportions 30 (blue), 33 (white) and 37 (red). Under Napoleon I, the proportions were changed to make the stripes' width equal, but by a regulation dated 17 May 1853, the navy went back to using the 30:33:37 proportions, which it now continues to use, as the flapping of the flag makes portions farther from the halyard seem smaller.

On French television interviews a flag with a much narrower white stripe is often used as a backdrop; a standard flag would show, close up, as only white.

Symbolism

Blue and red are the traditional colours of Paris, used on the city's coat of arms. Blue is identified with Saint Martin, red with Saint Denis. At the storming of the Bastille in 1789, the Paris militia wore blue and red cockades on their hats. White had long featured prominently on French flags and is described as the "ancient French colour" by Lafayette. White was added to the "revolutionary" colours of the militia cockade to "nationalise" the design, thus forming the cockade of France. Although Lafayette identified the white stripe with the nation, other accounts identify it with the monarchy. Lafayette denied that the flag contains any reference to the red-and-white livery of the Duc d'Orléans. Despite this, Orléanists adopted the tricolour as their own.

Blue and red are associated with the Virgin Mary, the patroness of France, and were the colours of the oriflamme. The colours of the French flag may also represent the three main estates of the Ancien Régime (the clergy: white, the nobility: red and the bourgeoisie: blue). Blue, as the symbol of class, comes first and red, representing the nobility, comes last. Both extreme colours are situated on each side of white referring to a superior order.

Lafayette's cockade of France was adopted in July 1789, a moment of national unity that soon faded. Royalists began wearing white cockades and flying white flags, while the Jacobins, and later the Socialists, flew the red flag. The tricolour, which combines royalist white with republican red, came to be seen as a symbol of moderation and of a nationalism that transcended factionalism.

The French government website states that the white field was the colour of the king, while blue and red were the colours of Paris.

The three colours are occasionally taken to represent the three elements of the revolutionary motto, liberté (freedom: blue), égalité (equality: white), fraternité (brotherhood: red); this symbolism was referenced in Krzysztof Kieślowski's three colours film trilogy, for example.

In the aftermath of the November 2015 Paris attacks, many famous landmarks and stadiums were illuminated in the flag colours to honour the victims.

History

Kingdom of France

During the early Middle Ages, the oriflamme, the flag of Saint Denis, was used—red, with two, three, or five spikes. Originally, it was the royal banner under the Capetians. It was stored in Saint-Denis abbey, where it was taken when war broke out. French kings went forth into battle preceded either by Saint Martin's red cape, which was supposed to protect the monarch, or by the red banner of Saint Denis.

Later during the Middle Ages, these colours came to be associated with the reigning house of France. In 1328, the coat-of-arms of the House of Valois was blue with gold fleurs-de-lis bordered in red. From this time on, the kings of France were represented in vignettes and manuscripts wearing a red gown under a blue coat decorated with gold fleurs-de-lis.

During the Hundred Years' War, England was recognised by a red cross; Burgundy, a red saltire; and France, a white cross. This cross could figure either on a blue or a red field. The blue field eventually became the common standard for French armies. The French regiments were later assigned the white cross as standard, with their proper colours in the cantons. The French flag of a white cross on a blue field is still seen on some flags derived from it, such as those of Quebec and Martinique.

The flag of Joan of Arc during the Hundred Years' War is described in her own words, "I had a banner of which the field was sprinkled with lilies; the world was painted there, with an angel at each side; it was white of the white cloth called 'boccassin'; there was written above it, I believe, 'JHESUS MARIA'; it was fringed with silk." Joan's standard led to the prominent use of white on later French flags.

From the accession of the Bourbons to the throne of France, the green ensign of the navy became a plain white flag, the symbol of purity and royal authority. The merchant navy was assigned "the old flag of the nation of France", the white cross on a blue field. There also was a red jack for the French galleys. The Kingdom of France flag consists of a white banner with 86 Fleur-de-lis and their Coat of Arms or without. (Variant)

The Tricolore

The tricolour flag is derived from the cockade of France used during the French Revolution. These were circular rosette-like emblems attached to the hat. Camille Desmoulins asked his followers to wear green cockades on 12 July 1789. The Paris militia, formed on 13 July, adopted a blue and red cockade. Blue and red are the traditional colours of Paris, and they are used on the city's coat of arms. Cockades with various colour schemes were used during the storming of the Bastille on 14 July. The blue and red cockade was presented to King Louis XVI at the Hôtel de Ville on 17 July. Lafayette argued for the addition of a white stripe to "nationalise" the design. On 27 July, a tricolour cockade was adopted as part of the uniform of the National Guard, the national police force that succeeded the militia.

A drapeau tricolore with vertical red, white and blue stripes was approved by the Constituent Assembly on 24 October 1790. Simplified designs were used to illustrate how the revolution had broken with the past. The order was reversed to blue-white-red, the current design, by a resolution passed on 15 February 1794.

When the Bourbon dynasty was restored following the defeat of Napoleon in 1815, the tricolore—with its revolutionary connotations—was replaced by a white flag, the pre-revolutionary naval flag. However, following the July Revolution of 1830, the "citizen-king", Louis-Philippe, restored the tricolore, and it has remained France's national flag since that time.

Following the overthrow of Napoleon III, voters elected a royalist majority to the National Assembly of the new Third Republic. This parliament then offered the throne to the Bourbon pretender, Henri, Comte de Chambord.  However, he insisted that he would accept the throne only on the condition that the tricolour be replaced by the white flag. As the tricolour had become a cherished national symbol, this demand proved impossible to accommodate. Plans to restore the monarchy were adjourned and ultimately dropped, and France has remained a republic, with the tricolour flag, ever since.

The Vichy régime, which dropped the word "republic" in favour of "the French state", maintained the use of the tricolore, but Philippe Pétain used as his personal standard a version of the flag with, in the white stripe, an axe made with a star-studded marshal's baton. This axe is called the "Francisque" in reference to the ancient Frankish throwing axe. During this same period, the Free French Forces used a tricolore with, in the white stripe, a red Cross of Lorraine.

The constitutions of 1946 and 1958 instituted the "blue, white, and red" flag as the national emblem of the Republic.

The colours of the national flag are occasionally said to represent different flowers; blue represents cornflowers, white represents marguerites, and red represents poppies.

Regimental flags

Naval flags

Colonial flags

Most French colonies either used the regular tricolour or a regional flag without the French flag. There were some exceptions:

Other
Many provinces and territories in Canada have French-speaking communities with flags representing their communities:

Many areas in North America have substantial French-speaking and ancestral communities:

New Hebrides used several flags incorporating both the British Union Flag and the French flag.

In the Shanghai International Settlement, the flag of Shanghai Municipal Council has a shield incorporating the French tricolour.

Two territories of Vietnam used flags based on the tricolour flag of France.

Gallery

See also

 List of French flags
 Flags of the regions of France
 National emblem of France
 Armorial of France
 Cockade of France
 Flag of Madriz Department, Nicaragua, similar design
 Flag of Haiti (based on French Republican flag)

Notes

References

Sources

Further reading
 Flags Through the Ages and Across the World, Smith, Whitney, McGraw-Hill Book Co. Ltd, England, 1975. .

External links

 
 French flag at Flags Corner 

National symbols of France
France
 
Articles containing video clips
Flags introduced in 1794
Flags introduced in 1830